Hesudra mjobergi is a moth of the family Erebidae. It was described by George Talbot in 1926. It is found on Borneo, Sulawesi and Seram.

References

 

Lithosiina
Moths described in 1926